The Minister for Foreign Affairs is the head of the Ministry of Foreign Affairs of Denmark. The officeholder is in charge of Danish (Denmark proper, the Faroe Islands and Greenland) foreign policy and international relations.

The current Minister for Foreign Affairs is former Prime Minister Lars Løkke Rasmussen.

See also 
 List of Danish foreign ministers

Notes

References

External links 
 The Minister for Foreign Affair's homepage at the website of the Ministry for Foreign Affairs

 
Foreign relations of Denmark
Foreign Affairs